Theodore Henry Ford (born February 7, 1947) is a former right-handed Major League Baseball outfielder who played for the Cleveland Indians and Texas Rangers from 1970 to 1973. He is the grandfather of Darren Ford, who debuted with the San Francisco Giants in 2010.

Career
Drafted by the Indians 11th overall in the 1966 amateur draft, Ford began his professional career with the Dubuque Packers.

The following year, he played for the Pawtucket Indians. He hit only .210 in 443 at-bats with them.

He missed the entire 1968 and 1969 seasons due to military service.

In 1970, he mostly played for the Wichita Aeros, hitting .326 with 12 home runs and 57 RBI in 383 at-bats with them. However, he started the season with the big league club. On April 7, he made his major league debut with the Indians. Facing star pitcher Dave McNally of the Baltimore Orioles, he went 0–2 with a walk in his first game.

He spent time in both the majors and minors in 1971 as well. In the majors, he hit .194 in 196 at-bats. In the minors - playing for the Aeros again - he hit .330 in 176 at-bats.

On April 3, 1972, Ford was traded to the Texas Rangers for Roy Foster and Tommy McCraw. He played in 129 games with the Rangers that year, hitting 14 home runs and driving 50 runs in in 429 at-bats. His batting average was .235. Ford spent nine games with the Denver Bears that year as well, hitting .222 in 36 at-bats.

Ford returned to the Indians along with Dick Bosman from the Rangers for Steve Dunning on May 10, 1973. He appeared in only 11 big league games that season, hitting .225 in 40 at-bats. He played his final game on September 29.

Although his major league career was over after 1973, he was still involved in notable trades after that. On April 24, 1974, for example, he was traded back to the Rangers for Charlie Hudson.

Overall, Ford hit .219 in 240 major league games. In 711 at-bats, he hit 17 home runs and drove in 68 runs.

References

External links
, or Retrosheet

1947 births
Living people
African-American baseball players
Alacranes de Durango players
American expatriate baseball players in Mexico
Arizona Instructional League Athletics players
Baseball players from New Jersey
Broncos de Reynosa players
Charros de Jalisco players
Cleveland Indians players
Denver Bears players
Diablos Rojos del México players
Dubuque Packers players
Florida Instructional League Indians players
Hawaii Islanders players
Major League Baseball outfielders
Oklahoma City 89ers players
Pawtucket Indians players
People from Vineland, New Jersey
Saraperos de Saltillo players
Spokane Indians players
Sportspeople from Cumberland County, New Jersey
Texas Rangers players
Tigres de Aragua players
American expatriate baseball players in Venezuela
Tigres del México players
Wichita Aeros players
United States Army soldiers
21st-century African-American people
20th-century African-American sportspeople